Jocione Mendonça (1969/1970 — 29 June 2018), better known as Jailson Mendes and sometimes Pai de Família, was a Brazilian porn actor and YouTuber, known for his acting in Ícaro Studios' Ursos Grandes Peludos e Mansos that became an Internet meme.

Biography and popularity 

Jocione Mendonça was born in Iati, in 1969 o 1970. He studied until the fifth grade, and moved to São Paulo when he was 17 years old.  In 2005, Mendonça was in a square in São Paulo, when a couple came to him and invited him to participate in a porn film, Ursos Grandes Peludos e Mansos, by Ícaro Studios. He was suspicious, but accepted.

In the film, with the stage name of Jailson Mendes and acting alongside Paulo Guina, he says the phrase "Ai, que delícia" ("Oh, what a delight"), becoming "one of the most reverberated memes of recent years on the internet". In total, Jailson has made three films in his career, the first for a minimum wage fee and the last for R$100 "to help his friend who was going broke."

In late 2014, he created a YouTube channel on cooking, containing double-sense jokes, which had nearly 200,000 subscribers and 4 million views by the end of 2016. It was produced by Bruno Cury, Francisco Parente and Celso Limoli, replacing production company Freedom. Later, Mendonça started uploading gameplay videos, of games like Grand Theft Auto V, due to fan requests. In April 2018, Carlos Tramontina fell into a prank on TV Globo's SP1, when he read a question from a user with the name "Jailson Mendes", being the subject of several news.

Death 

On 29 June 2018, Jailson suffered a heart attack and was rescued to Hospital Planalto, in São Paulo, but died soon after, at the age of 48. Information about Mendonça's death was released by family members.

Legacy 

According to UOL, Mendonça was "one of the most reverberated memes of recent years on the internet". The game Ocolast, based in Outlast, was created in honor of the meme.

See also 

 Sanduíche-iche.
 Senhora?

References 

2018 deaths
Brazilian LGBT actors
Brazilian male pornographic film actors
Brazilian YouTubers
Deaths in São Paulo (state)
Gay pornographic film actors
Internet memes
People from Pernambuco